The Austrian Roller Hockey National Championship is the biggest Roller Hockey Clubs Championship in Austria.

Participated Teams in the last Season
RHC Villach, RHC Wolfurt, RHC Dornbirn and RHC Dornbirn B.

List of Winners

Number of Championships by team

External links
 2011 season
 2010 season

Austrian websites
Videos of the 2009 Season

Austrian Teams Websites
RHC Wolfurt
RHC Dornbirn
URH Feldkirch
RHC Villach

International
Technichal information for Play Roller Hockey
HoqueiPatins.cat Rink Hockey Database
 Roller Hockey links worldwide
 Mundook-World Roller Hockey
Hardballhock-World Roller Hockey
Inforoller World Roller Hockey 
 World Roller Hockey Blog
rink-hockey-news - World Roller Hockey

Roller hockey competitions in Austria
Roller hockey in Austria
Sports leagues established in 1992
National roller hockey championships
Roller Hockey